Alex Hutchings is a professional guitarist based in Bristol, England. He especially plays and teaches jazz fusion, rock and r'n'b.

Since 2002, he has toured for a variety of different musical ensembles and brands.

Career 
Hutchings has the main guitar role on the Thriller – Live concert. He also composes music for BBC TV and radio and ITV.

In late 2017 he joined the Steven Wilson live band, touring with them in support of Wilson's To the Bone album.

In late 2019, Alex released his first online guitar masterclass with JTC Guitar named "Approach to Improvising Masterclass: Vol 1"

Equipment 
Hutchings has collaborated with Waghorn guitars, Rotosound strings, Laney Amplification and Roland Corporation.

References 

English rock guitarists
English jazz guitarists
English male guitarists
Living people
Musicians from Bristol
British music educators
British male jazz musicians
Year of birth missing (living people)